Harald Berntsen (born 25 January 1945 in Eidanger) is a national historian who is active in the radical left in Norway.

Background, upbringing and work 
Berntsen was born and brought up in Eidanger, an area with a strong industrial working class, in which Berntsen first entered politics. Berntsen was himself the son of a Hydro worker. The working environment at Norsk Hydro was very socialist and Berntsen later became politically engaged.

Berntsen later became a leader in the extreme left environment at Blindern. He joined Kjell Hovden in the Kommunistisk Arbeiderforbund in 1971, and was named to the central council of the Kommunistisk Universitetslag (KUL) during the 1970s, when KUL grew to become the student branch of the Kommunistisk Arbeiderforbund. Berntsen was one of the leading lights in the KUL, together with Jørgen Sandemose. On the radical left, Harald Berntsen was one of the AKP's bitterest critics. Berntsen was formerly married to Gerd-Liv Valla.

Berntsen has written two historical autobiographies:  from 1998 which documents the growth of the radical student movement in Norway in the 1960s, and the autobiographical novel Ut from 2001, which describes his childhood and youth in Eidanger and Herøya until he moved to Oslo to be a student.

Books 
(selected)

 Staurberaren: Per Borten (2007)
 Statsministerkuppet: Gerhardsen mot Nygaardsvold:  (2006)
  (2004)
  (2002)
  (2001)
  (2001)
  (1999)
  (1998)
  (1995)
 , with Lill-Ann Jensen (1993)
 I malstrømmen: Johan Nygaardsvold 1879–1952 (1991)
 Fagorganisasjonens høyskole: Sørmarka 1939–1989 (1989)
  (1987)
 , with Reinhard Kühnl (1974)

External links
 Interview with Berntsen in Klassekampen 2005-01-25  

20th-century Norwegian historians
People from Porsgrunn
1945 births
Living people
21st-century Norwegian historians